Mazha Nilaavu is a 1983 Indian Malayalam film, directed by S. A. Salam and produced by K. A. Divakaran. The film stars Prem Nazir, Jagathy Sreekumar, Bahadoor and Poornima Jayaram in the lead roles. The film has musical score by Raveendran.

Cast
Prem Nazir as Singapore Menon
Jagathy Sreekumar as Pushpangathan
Bahadoor as Abdulla
Poornima Jayaram as Susheela
Shanavas as Jayan
Manochithra as Poornima
Sankaradi as Sankara Pilla
Meena as Meenakshi
Mala Aravindan as Mathukutty
Praveena as Santha
Mohammed Ali

Soundtrack
The music was composed by Raveendran and the lyrics were written by Poovachal Khader and Chunakkara Ramankutty.

References

External links
 

1983 films
1980s Malayalam-language films